Tammijärvi is a lake in Finland. It is located in border of Uusimaa and Kymenlaakso. It is located in Loviisa, Pyhtää and Kouvola municipalities area.

References

Lakes of Loviisa
Lakes of Kouvola